EU Anti-racism Action Plan is an action plan by the European Union which will be carried out from 2020 through 2025. The plan was announced on 17 June 2020 by president of EU, Ursula von der Leyen, shortly after the shooting of George Floyd and massive protests of 2020 across the United States and worldwide. Every year a European Anti-Racism Summit will be held.

EU Anti-racism Action Plan funding is available under Next Generation EU recovery plan.

Plan 
The goal of EU Anti-racism Action Plan is to encourage EU countries of implementing national action plans against racism and racial discrimination.

In March 2021 the European Commission established a member state sub-group of experts which developed the general guidelines necessary to create national action plans against racism and racial discrimination. The guidelines are intended to serve as a framework for Member States to facilitate the process of developing and implementing national action plans. The guidelines were released in March 2022.

Controversy

European Network Against Racism and Equinox have caused a controversy reproaching to the European Commission an insufficient engagement with the civil society representing racialised communities ahead of the first European Anti-Racism Summit organized in 2021.

Goals 

 Better enforcement of EU law
 Closer coordination - The European Commission will appoint a coordinator for anti-racism
 Fair policing and protection
 Reinforced action at national level
 Increased diversity of EU staff

See also 

 Racial Equality Directive (Directive 2000/43/EC)
 European Commission against Racism and Intolerance (ECRI)

External links 

 Anti-Racism Summit
 European Parliament Anti-Racism and Diversity Intergroup (ARDI)

References 

Racism in Europe
European Union directives